Patiparn Phetphun (born September 25, 1980), simply known as Tob, is a Thai retired professional footballer who played as a center back. He graduated from Wat Suthiwararam School and Dhurakij Pundit University. He won the domestic championship in 2006 with Bangkok University FC, therefore also gaining valuable experience in the Asian Champions League the following season.

International career

Patiparn was a member of the victorious T&T Cup squad in 2008. He scored the winner in the last minute against North Korea in the opening game of the 3 team round robin group, which proved to be the decisive goal in lifting the cup

International

International goals

Honours

Club
Bangkok United
 Thai Premier League (1): 2006

PEA
 Thai Premier League (1): 2008

Police United
 Thai Division 1 League (1): 2015

References

External links

1980 births
Living people
Patiparn Phetphun
Patiparn Phetphun
Association football central defenders
Patiparn Phetphun
Patiparn Phetphun
Patiparn Phetphun
Patiparn Phetphun
Patiparn Phetphun
Patiparn Phetphun
Patiparn Phetphun
Patiparn Phetphun
Patiparn Phetphun
Patiparn Phetphun
2007 AFC Asian Cup players